Robert Ward (born 1881) was a Scottish professional footballer who played as a goalkeeper for clubs including Sunderland.

References

1881 births
Footballers from Glasgow
Scottish footballers
Association football goalkeepers
Abercorn F.C. players
Port Glasgow Athletic F.C. players
Sunderland A.F.C. players
Bradford (Park Avenue) A.F.C. players
English Football League players
Scottish Football League players
Year of death missing